BNS Abu Ubaidah is a Type 053H3 frigate of the Bangladesh Navy. She is serving the Bangladesh Navy since 2020. The Ship is named after one of the Rashidun army commander Abu Ubaidah ibn al-Jarrah.

History
The Type 053H3 frigate BNS Abu Ubaidah was previously known as either Jiaxing (521) or Putian (523). According to some sources  Jiaxing (521) sold to Bangladesh Navy as BNS Abu Ubaidah (F-19). However, according to other sources, Jiaxing (521) is still in service with PLAN as of April 2020 and Putian is the ship actually sold as BNS Abu Ubaidah (F-19). The ship previously served with the People's Liberation Army Navy (PLAN) in the East Sea Fleet. It was commissioned in PLAN in December 1999. In 2019, the ship was decommissioned and sold to the Bangladesh Navy. The ship was handed over to the Bangladesh Navy on 18 December 2019. She started her journey to new home, Bangladesh on 23 December 2019. She reached Mongla, Bangladesh on 9 January 2020. She was commissioned to the Bangladesh Navy on 5 November 2020.

Armament
The ship is armed with two quad-pack C-802A anti-ship missile launchers. It also carries one PJ33A dual 100 mm gun to engage surface targets. For anti-aircraft role, the ship carries an eight cell FM-90 Surface-to-air missile launcher system. Besides, four Type 76A dual 37 mm AA guns are also there. For anti-submarine operations, the ship has two 6-tube Type 3200 ASW rocket launchers and two depth charge (DC) racks and four DC projectors. Type 946/PJ-46 15-barrel decoy rocket launchers are also in the ship for anti-ship missile defence.

See also
 List of active ships of the Bangladesh Navy

References

Ships of the Bangladesh Navy
Frigates of the Bangladesh Navy
Type 053H3 frigates of the Bangladesh Navy
Ships built in China